Wyoming Airlines, or Wyoming Airlines Limited was an airline based in Cheyenne, Wyoming, United States. The airline only operated for 1 year, from 1978 to 1979.

Destinations
According to the timetable image, these are the destinations Wyoming airlines serviced:

References

Defunct airlines of the United States